The River Balvaig (Scottish Gaelic: "Abhainn Balbhaig") is a short river, approximately  long, draining from the head of Loch Voil near Balquhidder in Scotland and then passing southwards through the village of Strathyre before flowing into the northern end of Loch Lubnaig.

Rivers of Stirling (council area)
2Balvag